The 2016–17 First Football League of Kosovo is the 71st season of 2nd division football in Kosovo. The season began on 27 August 2016 and ended on 27 May 2017, with the playoffs concluding on 6 June 2017.

League table

Results

Each team plays twice against every opponent (once at home and once away) for a total of 30 games played each

Relegation play-offs

KF Ulpiana were relegated to the 2nd League, while KF Kika got promoted to the First League

Rahoveci & KF Lugu i Baranit remained in their respective leagues

References 

First Football League of Kosovo
Kosovo
2